Celton Ansumane Biai (born 13 August 2000) is a Portuguese professional footballer who plays as a goalkeeper for the Primeira Liga club Vitória Guimarães.

Club career
Biai is a youth product of the academy Benfica, having joined them at the age of 9 in 2009. On 14 September 2018, he signed his first professional contract with Benfica until 2023. He was the named the goalie of the season for the U23 Liga Revelação for the 2018–19 season. On 30 January 2020, he transferred to Vitória Guimarães where he was initially assigned to their reserves. He made his senior debut with Vitória Guimarães in a 3–1 Taça de Portugal win over Canelas on 15 October 2022.

International career
Born in Portugal, Biai is of Bissau-Guinean descent. He is a youth international for Portugal, having played up to the Portugal U21s.

References

External links
 
 

2000 births
Living people
Footballers from Lisbon
Portuguese footballers
Portugal youth international footballers
Portuguese sportspeople of Bissau-Guinean descent
Association football goalkeepers
S.L. Benfica B players
Vitória S.C. players
Vitória S.C. B players
Primeira Liga players
Campeonato de Portugal (league) players